Rodney Ellis Tention (born May 27, 1963) is an American basketball coach who currently serves as an assistant coach at Cal Poly.

Tention was formerly the head men's basketball coach at the College of Notre Dame and Loyola Marymount University. He then served an assistant at Stanford University under head coach Johnny Dawkins for three years, at San Diego under Bill Grier for five, and at San Jose State under Dave Wojcik for two. Following Wojcik's resignation, Tention became interim head coach of San Jose State on July 11, 2017. He held this position while the school performed its search, eventually hiring Jean Prioleau.

Head coaching record

References

External links
San Diego bio
Stanford bio
Loyola Marymount bio
Arizona bio

1963 births
Living people
Air Force Falcons men's basketball players
American men's basketball players
Arizona Wildcats men's basketball coaches
Basketball coaches from Ohio
Basketball players from Columbus, Ohio
College men's basketball head coaches in the United States
High school basketball coaches in California
Junior college men's basketball coaches in the United States
Junior college men's basketball players in the United States
Loyola Marymount Lions men's basketball coaches
Notre Dame de Namur Argonauts men's basketball coaches
Point guards
San Diego Toreros men's basketball coaches
San Francisco Dons men's basketball players
San Jose State Spartans men's basketball coaches
South Florida Bulls men's basketball coaches
Sportspeople from Columbus, Ohio
Stanford Cardinal men's basketball coaches